2017–18 Premier Badminton League (also known as Vodafone PBL for sponsorship reasons) was the third edition of Premier Badminton League. It started on 23 December 2017 and concluded on 14 January 2018. It consisted of 20 league ties (each tie consisting of 5 matches) with the top four teams progressing to the knock out stages. The season featured two new teams – Ahmedabad Smash Masters and North Eastern Warriors – bringing the total to eight competing teams. Also, the Delhi team previously known as Delhi Acers will feature as Delhi Dashers.

Hyderabad Hunters were crowned the champions after they beat Bengaluru Blasters 4 - 3 in the final tie.

Squads

Points table

 Qualified for knockouts
Five matches will be played in each tie (TP)
1 point for each Regular Match Won (RMW) 
0 points for Regular Matches Lost (RML)
2 points for each Trump Match Won (TMW) 
-1 point for each Trump Match Lost (TML)
Source: Official PBL website

Fixtures

League stage

Source: Official PBL website

Knockout stage

References

Premier Badminton League
Premier Badminton League
Premier Badminton League
Premier Badminton League
Badminton tournaments in India
Premier Badminton League